Anette Thomas-Sanford (born April 1983) is a Dominican nurse and politician.  She served as a Senator in the House of Assembly from 10 February 2020 to 6 December 2022 for the opposition United Workers' Party.

Early life 
Anette Thomas was born to a farming family in the Kalinago Territory village of Sineku in April 1983.  She was the seventh of eight children; her mother died when Thomas was seven years old.  Thomas later married Claudius Sanford.

Sanford graduated with an associate degree in nursing from Dominica State College, and studied health administration at St. Lawrence College, Ontario.  She later completed a Bachelor of Science in nursing from the University of Edinburgh via distance learning.  In 2018, she launched a six-month program to train professional caregivers for the elderly, children, and the disabled; seventeen students completed the program in its first offering.

Politics 
After working as a registered nurse for ten years, Sanford decided to run in the 2019 elections for Chief of the Kalinago Territory.  She was the only female candidate; if she won, she would become the first female chief since the colonial era.  She took part in the election debate held on 18 July 2019.  In the election on 22 July 2019, Sanford lost by three votes to Lorenzo Sanford.  This result was also affected by rejected ballots: nine ballots for Sanford were rejected, while only three were rejected for Lorenzo.  Although all candidates were officially nonpartisan, Lorenzo had been endorsed by the local branch chairman of the ruling Dominica Labour Party (DLP).

In August 2019, the Salybia constituency candidate for the opposition United Workers' Party (UWP), Worrel Sanford, decided to withdraw.  Sanford then accepted the UWP nomination as its candidate for the 2019 general election.  She also praised the UWP's proposal to give the Kalinago Chief a seat in the House of Assembly of Dominica.  At the official launch of her campaign in November, Sanford revealed that DLP officials had offered EC$120,000 and a job promotion if she would withdraw.  She lost to the incumbent DLP candidate Cozier Frederick by 265 votes.

Sanford was chosen as one of the UWP's four Senators for the new parliamentary term, taking the oath of office on 10 February 2020.  She became the first female Kalinago Senator.  She joined the UWP's COVID-19 committee to educate the public. During Nurses Week (11–17 May 2020), Sanford announced that she would donate half of her Senator salary to the Dominica Nurses Association to support its work during the COVID-19 pandemic in Dominica.  She also started a Backyard Garden Initiative in the Territory to help residents during the downturn in tourism.  In the interest of transparency, Sanford pushed for regular audits of Kalinago Council finances; before 2020, the Council had not been audited for a decade.

In 2021, Sanford co-founded a non-governmental organization called Kibe'kuati to support community development projects in the Kalinago Territory.

Sanford participated in the united opposition boycott of the 2022 Dominican general election. At the November 2022 UWP delegates conference, Sanford contested the election for deputy political leader. The other candidate, Clement Marcellin, was running for both the leader and deputy leader positions. Marcellin defeated Sanford for deputy leader (142 to 54), but lost the leader election (79 to 123).

References

External links 
 Official Page on Facebook
Interview with PushPast10 (2021)

Living people
1983 births
21st-century Dominica politicians
Alumni of the University of Edinburgh
Dominica people of Carib descent
Dominica women in politics
Indigenous politicians of the Americas
Members of the House of Assembly of Dominica
People from Saint David Parish, Dominica
United Workers' Party (Dominica) politicians
Women nurses
21st-century Dominica women politicians